Gynandrobrotica is a genus of skeletonizing leaf beetles in the family Chrysomelidae, found in the Neotropics. The genus contains at least 13 species.

Species
These 13 species belong to the genus Gynandrobrotica:

 Gynandrobrotica caviceps (Baly, 1889)
 Gynandrobrotica equestris (Fabricius, 1787)
 Gynandrobrotica gestroi (Baly, 1889)
 Gynandrobrotica guerreroensis (Jacoby, 1892)
 Gynandrobrotica imitans (Jacoby, 1879)
 Gynandrobrotica jucunda (Baly, 1886)
 Gynandrobrotica lepida (Say, 1835)
 Gynandrobrotica nigrofasciata (Jacoby, 1889)
 Gynandrobrotica stevensi (Baly, 1886)
 Gynandrobrotica subsimilis (Baly, 1891)
 Gynandrobrotica tarsata (Gahan, 1891)
 Gynandrobrotica variabilis (Jacoby, 1887)
 Gynandrobrotica ventricosa (Jacoby, 1878)

References

External links

 

Galerucinae
Chrysomelidae genera